Trilobite larva may refer to juvenile forms (larvae) of multiple unrelated groups of animals:

Trilobites, extinct arthropods
Xiphosura (horseshoe crabs), including living and fossil species
Platerodrilus or trilobite beetles, a genus of living insects